The national emblem of the Kalmyk Autonomous Soviet Socialist Republic was adopted in 1937 by the government of the Kalmyk Autonomous Soviet Socialist Republic. The emblem is identical to the emblem of the Russian Soviet Federative Socialist Republic.

History

First version 
On June 23, 1937 the Constitution of the Kalmyk ASSR was adopted. The chapter 10 of the Constitution contained the description of the emblem of Kalmyk ASSR:

Second version 
In 1940, the Kalmyk alphabet was converted from Latin to Cyrillic letters. Based on this change, the inscriptions on the emblem of the Kalmyk ASSR also changed.

Liquidation and restoration of the Kalmyk ASSR 
From October 1942 until January 1943, a significant part of the territory of the Kalmyk ASSR was occupied by German troops, with whom part of the population cooperated. After the Soviet Army liberated the territory of the Kalmyk ASSR by the bodies of the OGPU and NKVD at the end of 1943, the sweeping false accusations of the entire Kalmyk people were inspired in cooperation with the Nazis, and by the decision of the State Defense Committee of the USSR, all Kalmyk people were deported to Central Asia, the Kalmyk ASSR was abolished, the territory of the former Kalmyk ASSR was included in the Astrakhan Region (part of the territory was included in the Stalingrad Region and the Stavropol Territory), and the city of Elista was renamed Stepnoy.

After the 20th Congress of the CPSU, on November 24, 1956, the Central Committee of the CPSU adopted a resolution "On Restoring the National Autonomy of the Kalmyk, Karachay, Balkar, Chechen and Ingush Peoples", which lifted the indiscriminate accusation of betrayal from the Kalmyk people and the allowance of Kalmyks to return to their former place of residence.

On January 9, 1957, by the decree of the Presidium of the Supreme Soviet of the USSR, the Kalmyk Autonomous Region was reorganized as part of the Stavropol Territory, which was transformed on July 29, 1958 into the Kalmyk ASSR with the restoration of the 1936 Constitution of the Kalmyk ASSR.

Third version 
The Kalmyk ASSR emblem, which was adopted in the constitution, was identical to the emblem of the RSFSR, but was supplemented by the name of the republic in Russian and in Kalmyk: "КАЛМЫЦКАЯ АССР - ХАЛЬМГ АССР" and the slogan in Kalmyk: "ЦУГОРН-НУТГУДЫН ПРОЛЕТАРМУД, НЕТДЦХӘТН!".

Fourth version 
With the adoption of the new Constitution of the Kalmyk ASSR on May 30, 1978, at the extraordinary 8th session of the Supreme Council of the sixth convocation, the description of the emblem underwent only minor changes. The emblem was described in article 157. The only changes were the addition of a red star in the top, and the motto underwent minor change to "ЦУГ-ОРН НУТГУДЫН ПРОЛЕТАРМУД, НЕГДЦХӘТН!"

Gallery 

Kalmyk Autonomous Soviet Socialist Republic
Kalmyk ASSR
Kalmyk ASSR
Kalmyk ASSR
Kalmyk ASSR
Kalmyk ASSR